The following elections occurred in the year 2009.

 Electoral calendar 2009
 2009 United Nations Security Council election

Caribbean
 2009 Antiguan general election
 2009 Aruban general election
 2009 Caymanian constitutional referendum
 2009 Caymanian general election
 2009 Curaçao status referendum
 2009 Dominican general election
 2009 Haitian Senate election
 2009 Montserratian general election
 2009 Vincentian constitutional referendum
 2009 Tobago House of Assembly election

Africa
 2009 Algerian presidential election
 2009 Botswana general election
 2009 Comorian constitutional referendum
 2009 Comorian legislative election
 2009 Democratic Republic of the Congo gubernatorial elections
 2009 Republic of the Congo presidential election
 2009 Equatorial Guinean presidential election
 2009 Gabonese presidential election
 2009 Guinea-Bissau presidential election
 2009 Mahoran status referendum
 2009 Malawian general election
 2009 Mauritanian presidential election
 2009 Mozambican general election
 2009 Namibian general election
 2009 Nigerien constitutional referendum
 2009 Nigerien parliamentary election
 2009 Somali presidential election
 2009 South African general election
 2009 South African presidential election
 2009 Tunisian general election

Asia
 2009 Afghan presidential election
 2009 Azerbaijani constitutional referendum
 2009 Bangkok gubernatorial election
 2009 Bangladeshi presidential election
 2009 Indonesian presidential election
 2009 Indonesian legislative election
 2009 Iranian presidential election
 2009 Israeli legislative election
 2009 Kuwaiti parliamentary election
 2009 Kyrgyz presidential election
 2009 Lebanese general election
 2009 Macanese legislative election
 2009 Maldivian parliamentary election
 2009 Mongolian presidential election
 2009 North Korean parliamentary election
 2009 Northern Cyprus parliamentary election
 2009 Sri Lanka Central and North Western Provincial Council elections
 2008–09 Sri Lankan provincial council elections
 2009 Sri Lankan local government elections
 2008–09 Turkmen parliamentary election
 2009–2010 Uzbek parliamentary election

India

Indian general
 2009 Indian general election analysis
 2009 Indian general election campaign controversies
 2009 Indian general election
 Indian general election in Uttar Pradesh, 2009
 Indian general election in West Bengal, 2009
 Indian general election in Orissa, 2009
 Indian general election in Gujarat, 2009
 Indian general election in Madhya Pradesh, 2009
 Indian general election in Andaman and Nicobar Islands, 2009
 Indian general election in Andhra Pradesh, 2009
 Indian general election in Assam, 2009
 Indian general election in Bihar, 2009
 Indian general election in Chandigarh, 2009
 Indian general election in Chhattisgarh, 2009
 Indian general election in Dadra & Nagar Haveli, 2009
 Indian general election in Daman & Diu, 2009
 Indian general election in Goa, 2009
 Indian general election in Haryana, 2009
 Indian general election in Jharkhand, 2009
 Indian general election in Karnataka, 2009
 Indian general election in Kerala, 2009
 Indian general election in Lakshadweep, 2009
 Indian general election in Maharashtra, 2009
 Indian general election in Manipur, 2009
 Indian general election in Meghalaya, 2009
 Indian general election in Mizoram, 2009
 Indian general election in Nagaland, 2009
 Indian general election in National Capital Territory of Delhi, 2009
 Indian general election in Pondicherry, 2009
 Indian general election in Punjab, 2009
 Indian general election in Rajasthan, 2009
 Indian general election in Sikkim, 2009
 Indian general election in Tamil Nadu, 2009
 Indian general election in Tripura, 2009
 Indian general election in Uttarakhand, 2009
 Results of the 2009 Indian general election by parliamentary constituency
 Results of the 2009 Indian general election by party
 Results of the 2009 Indian general election by state
 Results of the 2009 Indian general election in Tamil Nadu by state assembly constituents

Iraq
 2009 Kurdistan Region parliamentary election
 2009 Kurdistan Region presidential election

Iraqi governorate
 2009 Iraqi governorate elections
 2009 Al Anbar governorate election
 2009 Al Muthanna governorate election
 2009 Al-Qādisiyyah governorate election
 2009 Arbil governorate election
 2009 As Sulaymaniyah governorate election
 2009 Babil governorate election
 2009 Baghdad governorate election
 2009 Basra governorate election
 2009 Dahuk governorate election
 2009 Dhi Qar governorate election
 2009 Diyala governorate election
 2009 Karbala governorate election
 2009 Kirkuk governorate election
 2009 Maysan governorate election
 2009 Najaf governorate election
 2009 Ninawa governorate election
 2009 Salah ad Din governorate election
 2009 Wasit governorate election

Japan
 2009 Japanese general election
 2009 Democratic Party (Japan, 1998) leadership election
 2009 Liberal Democratic Party (Japan) leadership election
 2009 Tokyo prefectural election
 2009 Yokohama mayoral election

Malaysia
 2009 Bagan Pinang by-election
 2009 Batang Ai by-election
 2009 Bukit Gantang by-election
 2009 Bukit Selambau by-election
 2009 Kuala Terengganu by-election
 2009 Penanti by-election

Taiwan (Republic of China)
 2009 Taiwanese local elections

Europe
 2009 Abkhazian presidential election
 2009 Albanian parliamentary election
 2009 Andorran parliamentary election
 2009 Azerbaijani constitutional referendum
 2009 Basque regional election
 2009 Belgian regional elections
 2009 Bulgarian parliamentary election
 2009–2010 Croatian presidential election
 2009 Croatian local elections
 2009 Danish Act of Succession referendum
 2009 Danish local elections
 2009 European Parliament election in Romania
 2009 European Parliament election in Slovenia
 2009 Fingal County Council election
 2009 Greek legislative election
 2009 Icelandic parliamentary election
 2009 Irish local elections
 2009 Kosovan local elections
 2009 Liechtenstein general election
 2009 Lithuanian presidential election
 2009 Luxembourg general election
 2009 Macedonian presidential election
 2009 Maltese presidential election
 April 2009 Moldovan parliamentary election
 July 2009 Moldovan parliamentary election
 2009 Montenegrin parliamentary election
 2009 New Democracy leadership election
 2009 Northern Cyprus parliamentary election
 2009 Norwegian parliamentary election
 2009 Norwegian Sami parliamentary election
 2009 Portuguese legislative election
 2009 Romanian parliamentary reform referendum
 2009 Romanian presidential election
 2009 Slovak presidential election
 2009 Sammarinese local elections
 2009 South Ossetian parliamentary election
 2009 Split local elections
 2009 Ternopil Oblast local election
 2009 Turkish local elections
 Twenty-eighth Amendment of the Constitution of Ireland
 2009 Zagreb local elections

Austria
 2009 Carinthian state and municipal elections
 2009 European Parliament election in Austria
 2009 Salzburg state and municipal elections
 2009 Upper Austrian state election
 2009 Vorarlberg state election

European Parliament
 2009 European Parliament election
 2009 European Parliament election in Austria
 2009 European Parliament election in Belgium
 2009 European Parliament election in Bulgaria
 2009 European Parliament election in Cyprus
 2009 European Parliament election in the Czech Republic
 2009 European Parliament election in Denmark
 2009 European Parliament election in Estonia
 2009 European Parliament election in Aosta Valley
 2009 European Parliament election in Friuli-Venezia Giulia
 2009 European Parliament election in Lombardy
 2009 European Parliament election in Piedmont
 2009 European Parliament election in Sardinia
 2009 European Parliament election in Sicily
 2009 European Parliament election in Trentino-Alto Adige/Südtirol
 2009 European Parliament election in Veneto
 2009 European Parliament election in Finland
 2009 European Parliament election in France
 2009 European Parliament election in Germany
 2009 European Parliament election in Gibraltar
 2009 European Parliament election in Greece
 2009 European Parliament election in Hungary
 2009 European Parliament election in Ireland
 2009 European Parliament election in Italy
 2009 European Parliament election in Latvia
 List of Libertas list candidates at the 2009 European Parliament elections
 2009 European Parliament election in Lithuania
 2009 European Parliament election in Luxembourg
 2009 European Parliament election in Malta
 2009 European Parliament election in the Netherlands
 2009 European Parliament election in Poland
 2009 European Parliament election in Portugal
 2009 European Parliament election in Romania
 2009 European Parliament election in Slovakia
 2009 European Parliament election in Slovenia
 2009 European Parliament election in Spain
 2009 European Parliament election in Sweden
 2009 European Parliament election in the United Kingdom

Germany
 2009 Brandenburg state election
 2009 European Parliament election in Germany
 2009 German federal election
 2009 German presidential election
 2009 Hessian state election
 2009 Saarland state election
 2009 Saxony state election
 2009 Schleswig-Holstein state election
 2009 Thuringia state election

Italy
 2009 Democratic Party (Italy) leadership election
 2009 European Parliament election in Aosta Valley
 2009 European Parliament election in Friuli-Venezia Giulia
 2009 European Parliament election in Italy
 2009 European Parliament election in Lombardy
 2009 European Parliament election in Piedmont
 2009 European Parliament election in Sardinia
 2009 European Parliament election in Sicily
 2009 European Parliament election in Trentino-Alto Adige/Südtirol
 2009 European Parliament election in Veneto
 2009 Italian electoral law referendum
 2009 Sardinian regional election

Moldova
 April 2009 Moldovan parliamentary election
 July 2009 Moldovan parliamentary election
 Moldovan presidential election, May–June 2009
 Moldovan presidential election, November–December 2009

Spain
 2009 European Parliament election in Spain
 2009 Galician regional election

Switzerland
 2009 Swiss Federal Council election
 2009 Grand Council of Geneva election
 2009 Grand Council of Valais election
 February 2009 Swiss referendum
 May 2009 Swiss referendum
 November 2009 Swiss referendum
 September 2009 Swiss referendum

United Kingdom
 2009 Doncaster Council mayoral election
 2009 European Parliament election in the United Kingdom
 2009 Glasgow North East by-election
 2009 Norwich North by-election
 2009 Speaker of the British House of Commons election
 2009 UK Independence Party leadership election
 2009 United Kingdom local elections

United Kingdom local
 2009 United Kingdom local elections

English local
 2009 Bristol City Council election
 2009 Buckinghamshire County Council election
 2009 Cambridgeshire County Council election
 2009 Cornwall Council election
 2009 Cumbria Council election
 2009 Derbyshire County Council election
 2009 Devon County Council election
 2009 Dorset County Council election
 2009 East Sussex County Council election
 2009 Essex Council election
 2009 Gloucestershire County Council election
 2009 Hampshire County Council election
 2009 Hartlepool Council mayoral election
 2009 Hertfordshire Council election
 2009 Isle of Wight Council election
 2009 Isles of Scilly Council election
 2009 Kent Council election
 2009 Lancashire County Council election
 2009 Leicestershire County Council election
 2009 Lincolnshire County Council election
 2009 Norfolk Council election
 2009 North Tyneside Council mayoral election
 2009 North Yorkshire Council election
 2009 Northamptonshire Council election
 2009 Nottinghamshire Council election
 2009 Oxfordshire County Council election
 2009 Shropshire Council election
 2009 Somerset Council election
 2009 Staffordshire Council election
 2009 Suffolk County Council election
 2009 Surrey County Council election
 2009 Warwickshire County Council election
 2009 West Sussex County Council election
 2009 Wiltshire Council election
 2009 Worcestershire Council election

North America
 2009 Belizean municipal elections
 2009 Greenlandic parliamentary election
 2009 Honduran general election
 2009 Panamanian general election
 2009 Salvadoran legislative election
 2009 Salvadoran presidential election

Canada
 Canadian electoral calendar, 2009
 2009 Bedford municipal election
 2009 Brigham municipal election
 2009 British Columbia electoral reform referendum
 2009 British Columbia general election
 2009 Bromont municipal election
 2009 Canadian federal by-elections
 2009 Cowansville municipal election
 2009 Green Party of Ontario leadership election
 2009 Liberal Party of Canada leadership election
 2009 Magog municipal election
 2009 Manitoba provincial by-elections
 2009 New Democratic Party of Manitoba leadership election
 2009 Newfoundland and Labrador municipal elections
 2009 Nova Scotia general election
 Ontario New Democratic Party leadership convention, 2009
 2009 Progressive Conservative Party of Ontario leadership election
 2009 Action démocratique du Québec leadership election
 2009 Saskatchewan municipal elections
 2009 Wildrose Alliance Party of Alberta leadership election

Quebec municipal
 2009 Quebec municipal elections
 2009 Gatineau municipal election
 2009 Montreal municipal election

Caribbean
 2009 Antigua and Barbuda general election
 2009 Aruban general election
 2009 Caymanian constitutional referendum
 2009 Caymanian general election
 2009 Curaçao status referendum
 2009 Dominican general election
 2009 Haitian Senate election
 2009 Montserratian general election
 2009 Saint Vincent and the Grenadines constitutional referendum
 2009 Tobago House of Assembly election

Mexico
 2009 Mexican elections
 2009 Colima state election
 2009 Mexican legislative election
 2009 Nuevo León state election

United States
 2009 United States elections

United States House of Representatives
 2009 California's 10th congressional district special election
 2009 California's 32nd congressional district special election
 2009 Illinois's 5th congressional district special election
 2009 New York's 20th congressional district special election
 2009 New York's 23rd congressional district special election

United States gubernatorial
 2009 United States gubernatorial elections
 2009 New Jersey gubernatorial election
 2009 Northern Mariana Islands gubernatorial election
 2009 Virginia gubernatorial election

United States mayoral
 2009 Albuquerque mayoral election
 2009 Anchorage mayoral election
 2009 Atlanta elections
 2009 Austin mayoral election
 2009 Boston mayoral election
 2009 Buffalo mayoral election
 2009 Burlington mayoral election
 2009 Charlotte mayoral election
 2009 Detroit mayoral election
 2009 Houston mayoral election
 2009 Houston elections
 2009 Jersey City mayoral election
 2009 Lancaster, Pennsylvania mayoral election
 2009 Los Angeles mayoral election
 2009 Minneapolis municipal election
 2009 Mobile municipal elections
 2009 New York City mayoral election
 2009 Omaha mayoral election
 2009 Pittsburgh mayoral election
 2009 Raleigh mayoral election
 2009 Rochester mayoral election
 2009 San Antonio mayoral election
 2009 Seattle mayoral election
 2009 Syracuse mayoral election
 2009 Tulsa, Oklahoma mayoral election

California
 2009 California state special elections
 2009 Los Angeles City Attorney election
 November 2009 San Francisco general election

Iowa
 2009 Iowa special elections

New Jersey
 2009 New Jersey elections
 2009 New Jersey General Assembly election

New York
 2009 New York elections
 2009 New York City Comptroller election
 2009 New York City Public Advocate election

Pennsylvania
 2009 Pennsylvania state elections

Virginia
 2009 Virginia elections
 2009 Virginia House of Delegates election

Washington (U.S. state)
 Washington Referendum 71 (2009)
 2009 Washington State local elections

Oceania
 February 2009 French Polynesian presidential election
 November 2009 French Polynesian presidential election
 2009 Vanuatuan presidential election
 2009 Marshall Islands presidential election
 2009 Micronesian parliamentary election
 2009 New Caledonian legislative election
 2009 Tamarua by-election

Australia
 2009 Bradfield by-election
 2009 Fremantle state by-election
 2009 Frome state by-election
 2009 Higgins by-election
 2009 Pembroke state by-election
 2009 Queensland state election
 2009 Western Australian daylight saving referendum

New Zealand
 2009 New Zealand citizens-initiated referendum
 2009 Mount Albert by-election

Northern Mariana Islands
 2009 Northern Mariana Islands general election
 2009 Northern Mariana Islands legislative election
 2009 Northern Mariana Islands gubernatorial election

South America
 2009 Argentine legislative election
 2009 Bolivian constitutional referendum
 2009 Bolivian general election
 2009 Chilean parliamentary election
 2009–10 Chilean presidential election
 2009 Ecuadorian general election
 2009 Falkland Islands general election
 2009 Uruguayan general election
 2009 Venezuelan constitutional referendum

See also

 
2009
Elections